Raccoon Island is an island on Lake Hopatcong in New Jersey, comprising about  with mixed private homes and lots. It is part of Jefferson Township, in Morris County, New Jersey.

Seasonal (April–October), limited scheduled ferry service provides access to the island by car or light truck. With this limited accessibility, few people live year-round on the island, but during the summer months many families from the surrounding area temporarily "relocate" and commute to their work from there.  The homes range from small cottages that were built from the 1880s onwards  to more contemporary and remodeled homes with sizable lots.  There is no public land on the island.

In the late 19th century, paddle-wheel boats used to provide transportation links from mainland railway stations to resort hotels and campsites on the island.  It was a summer tourist destination for New York City residents ( east) before expanded auto and boat transportation made more exotic travel feasible.

Bridge and Ferry History
In the past,  Lake Hopatcong was two separate lakes known as Big Pond and Little Pond. After development began in the 1880s, a bridge was built serving the island to the mainland. The Chincopee Bridge was opened in 1891 but collapsed in 1899. A new bridge was planned and approved in 1928, but the great depression halted that project. In 1932, a ferry service was started to serve the island from Chincopee Road, continuing through today.

References

Lake islands of New Jersey
Landforms of Morris County, New Jersey